George H. Richardson (in some references, George M. Richardson; died August 1948, aged 70) was an American Major League Baseball team owner. Richardson was a minority owner of the Washington Senators from the death of his twin brother, William, on June 10, 1942 until his own passing in 1948. He held 40.4 percent of club stock, the second-largest bloc of shares behind team president Clark Griffith's 44 percent, and also served as the Senators' treasurer. William Richardson, a grain dealer from Philadelphia who also was president of the Portland Cement Company, had been Griffith's "silent partner" since the two teamed up to purchase the franchise after the 1919 season.

External links
Sharp, Andrew, Washington Senators Team Ownership History, Society for American Baseball Research

1948 deaths
American sports businesspeople
Major League Baseball owners
Washington Senators (1901–1960) executives
Washington Senators (1901–1960) owners